Strakonice District is a district in the South Bohemian Region of the Czech Republic. Its capital is the town of Strakonice.

Administrative division
Strakonice District is divided into three administrative districts of municipalities with extended competence: Strakonice, Blatná and Vodňany.

List of municipalities
Towns are marked in bold and market towns in italics:

Bavorov -
Bělčice -
Bezdědovice -
Bílsko -
Blatná -
Bratronice -
Březí -
Budyně -
Buzice -
Čečelovice -
Cehnice -
Čejetice -
Čepřovice -
Čestice -
Chelčice -
Chlum -
Chobot -
Chrášťovice -
Číčenice -
Doubravice -
Drachkov -
Drahonice -
Drážov -
Dřešín -
Droužetice -
Hajany -
Hájek -
Hlupín -
Horní Poříčí -
Hornosín -
Hoslovice -
Hoštice -
Jinín -
Kadov -
Kalenice -
Katovice -
Kladruby -
Kocelovice -
Krajníčko -
Kraselov -
Krašlovice -
Krejnice -
Krty-Hradec -
Kuřimany -
Kváskovice -
Lažánky -
Lažany -
Libějovice -
Libětice -
Litochovice -
Lnáře -
Lom -
Mačkov -
Malenice -
Mečichov -
Měkynec -
Milejovice -
Miloňovice -
Mnichov -
Mutěnice -
Myštice -
Nebřehovice -
Němčice -
Němětice -
Nihošovice -
Nišovice -
Nová Ves -
Novosedly -
Osek -
Paračov -
Pivkovice -
Pohorovice -
Pracejovice -
Přechovice -
Předmíř -
Přední Zborovice -
Předslavice -
Přešťovice -
Radějovice -
Radomyšl -
Radošovice -
Řepice -
Rovná -
Sedlice -
Skály -
Skočice -
Škvořetice -
Slaník -
Sousedovice -
Štěchovice -
Štěkeň -
Stožice -
Strakonice -
Strašice -
Střelské Hoštice -
Strunkovice nad Volyňkou -
Tchořovice -
Třebohostice -
Třešovice -
Truskovice -
Úlehle -
Únice -
Uzenice -
Uzeničky -
Vacovice -
Velká Turná -
Vodňany -
Volenice -
Volyně -
Záboří -
Zahorčice -
Zvotoky

Geography

Most of the territory is characterized by an undulating landscape with many low hills, only the vicinity of the Otava River is flat. The territory extends into four geomorphological mesoregions: Blatná Uplands (north), Bohemian Forest Foothills (south), Benešov Uplands (northeast) and České Budějovice Basin (runs into the centre of the territory from the southeast).

The most important river is the Otava, which flows across the territory from west to east. The Lomnice River drains the northern part of the district and joins the Otava outside the district. The territory is rich in ponds.

There are no large-scale protected areas.

Demographics

Most populated municipalities

Economy
The largest employers with its headquarters in Strakonice District and at least 500 employers are:

Transport
There are no motorways in the district. The most important road is the I/20 road from Plzeň to České Budějovice, which is part of the European route E49.

Sights

The most important monuments in the district, protected as national cultural monuments, are:
Strakonice Castle
Watermill in Hoslovice

The best-preserved settlements and landscapes, protected as monument reservations and monument zones, are:

Nahořany (monument reservation)
Bavorov
Blatná
Sedlice
Vodňany
Volyně
Jiřetice
Kloub
Koječín
Křtětice
Kváskovice
Zechovice
Libějovicko-Lomecko landscape

The most visited tourist destination is the Blatná Castle.

References

External links

Strakonice District profile on the Czech Statistical Office's website

 
Districts of the Czech Republic